The 1910 Rhode Island gubernatorial election was held on November 8, 1910. Incumbent Republican Aram J. Pothier defeated Democratic nominee Lewis A. Waterman with 49.60% of the vote.

General election

Candidates
Major party candidates
Aram J. Pothier, Republican
Lewis A. Waterman, Democratic

Other candidates
Nathaniel C. Greene, Prohibition
Thomas F. Herrick, Socialist Labor

Results

References

1910
Rhode Island
Gubernatorial